Athulya Ravi  is an actress who has appeared in Tamil films. After making her debut with Kadhal Kan Kattudhe (2017), Athulya has gone on to act in films including Yemaali (2018) and Naadodigal 2 (2019).

Career
Athulya started her acting career through the short film "Palvaadi Kadhal". She had a leading role in Kadhal Kan Kattudhe (2017).

In 2018, she starred in V. Z. Durai's Yemaali. Portraying a character knows as "Ri" (Ritu), Athulya described that the character was a modern and independent girl, who is exactly opposite to what she was in real life. She played Aari's mute sister in Nagesh Thiraiyarangam (2018).

In 2019, she had roles in Suttu Pidikka Utharavu and Naadodigal 2.

Filmography

-

References

External links

Living people
Indian film actresses
Actresses in Tamil cinema
21st-century Indian actresses
1994 births